Bangladesh Computer Samity, popularly known as BCS, is the national association of information and communication technologies companies in Bangladesh. It was established in 1987 in Dhaka, Bangladesh.

About BCS 
According to Joint Stock Companies and Firms in Bangladesh, Bangladesh Computer Samity is the first ICT trade association of Bangladesh. In 1993 BCS registered with Federation of Bangladesh Chambers of Commerce & Industries as an 'A' category member. And 1998 they are registered as a member in WITSA. They are also an associate member of ASOCIO. Engr. Subrata Sarkar, Chairman of C & C Trade International, is currently serving as the president and MD. Rashed Ali Bhuiyan, Chairman of Star Tech & Engineering Ltd is currently serving as the vice President and Kamruzzaman Bhuiyan, Proprietor of South Bangla Computers is currently serving as Secretary General as Bangladesh Computer Samity   It is also the platform of all distributors, dealers, resellers of computer and allied products, locally assembled computer vendors, software developers and internet service providers, exporters.

BCS branches 
BCS has eight branches and executive committees among the Bangladesh for smooth operation. Branches are Sylhet, Khulna, Rajshahi, Mymensingh, Chittagong, Barisal, Jessore and Comilla.

Affiliations
 Asian-Oceanian Computing Industry Organization
 World Information Technology and Services Alliance
 Federation of Bangladesh Chambers of Commerce & Industries
 Ministry of Commerce (Bangladesh)
 Business Promotion Council (BPC)
 Bangladesh Association of Software and Information Services
 Bangladesh Computer Council

References

External links
 

Business organisations based in Bangladesh
Science and technology in Bangladesh
Technology trade associations
Organizations established in 1987